Epitedia is a genus of insects belonging to the family Hystrichopsyllidae.

The species of this genus are found in Northern America.

Species:
 Epitedia cavernicola Traub, 1957
 Epitedia faceta (Rothschild, 1915)

References

Hystrichopsyllidae
Siphonaptera genera